The 1895 Notre Dame football team was an American football team that represented the University of Notre Dame in the 1895 college football season. In its first and only season under head coach H. G. Hadden, the team compiled a 3–1 record and outscored its opponents by a combined total of 70 to 20.

Schedule

The team that played against Northwestern Law school on October 19 was technically not the varsity, but was instead made up of candidates for the varsity team.

References

Notre Dame
Notre Dame Fighting Irish football seasons
Notre Dame football